Indicators of overall population health in the Republic of Ireland include risk factors such as smoking, alcohol consumption and obesity; each of which tend towards rates higher than the OECD average.

Health indicators
There have been dramatic reductions in mortality from the three principal causes of death in Ireland - heart disease, cancer and stroke - in recent years age-standardised mortality rate for heart disease has fallen by 59% between 1990-2011 and now stands just above the OECD rate at 136 deaths per 100,000 population per annum. Similarly, the age-standardised mortality rate for stroke has fallen by 51% in the same period to below the OECD average (61 deaths from stroke per 100,000 population per annum). Deaths from cancer have fallen by 21% between 1990-2011 to 217 per 100,000.

In 2005:

 47.6% of Ireland's population were covered by private health insurance, and 31.9% of the population were covered by Medical Cards.
 23.8% of the population over 16 had a "chronic illness or health problem".
 19.6% of the population over 16 had "limited activity", of which 6.6% were "strongly limited" and 13.0% were "limited".
 47.2% of the population over 16 described their health as "very good", 35.7% as "good", 13.5% as "fair" and only 3.6% as "bad" or "very bad".
 24.9% of the population over 16 were classed as smokers.
 There were 53 publicly funded acute hospitals, with a total of 12,094 in-patient beds available and 1,253-day beds available.

A new measure of expected human capital calculated for 195 countries from 1990 to 2016 and defined for each birth cohort as the expected years lived from age 20 to 64 years and adjusted for educational attainment, learning or education quality, and functional health status was published by The Lancet in September 2018. Ireland had the sixteenth highest level of expected human capital with 24 health, education, and learning-adjusted expected years lived between age 20 and 64 years.

Vaccination
In the Republic of Ireland, childhood vaccination (up to age 16) requires the consent of the parents. The Department of Health strongly recommend vaccinations.

References